Corona is an unincorporated community in Walker County, Alabama, United States.

History
Corona was founded in the 1880s after the Corona Coal Company opened mines here. The first coal shipped from Walker County by rail came from the Corona mines. A post office operated under the name Corona from 1884 to 1957.

Notes

Unincorporated communities in Walker County, Alabama
Unincorporated communities in Alabama